JoAnn McClinton is an American politician. She served in the Georgia House of Representatives from 1993 through 2006.

McClinton's oldest daughter, Lita McClinton, was murdered in 1987.

References

Living people
Democratic Party members of the Georgia House of Representatives
Year of birth missing (living people)
Place of birth missing (living people)
20th-century American women politicians
20th-century American politicians
21st-century American women politicians
Women state legislators in Georgia (U.S. state)
21st-century American politicians